The King of Romania (Romanian: Regele României) or King of the Romanians (Romanian: Regele Românilor), was the title of the monarch of the Kingdom of Romania from 1881 until 1947, when the Romanian Workers' Party proclaimed the Romanian People's Republic following Michael I's forced abdication.

History

The state had been internationally recognized as a principality since 1862, after the creation of the United Principalities, a personal union between Moldavia and Wallachia, at that time vassal states of the Ottoman Empire. Alexander I became domnitor (ruling prince) after the official unification of the two formerly separate states, being elected prince of both states in 1859. He was deposed in 1866 by a broad coalition of the main political parties, after which parliament offered the throne to Prince Karl of Hohenzollern-Sigmaringen who subsequently became the new "Domnitor of Romania" (as Carol I).

Romania's independence from the Ottoman Empire was recognized in 1878 by the Treaty of Berlin.  In an expression of full sovereignty, the principality was elevated to a kingdom in 1881, with Carol I becoming King of Romania. Carol I died in 1914, and was succeeded by his nephew, Ferdinand I.

In 1927, Ferdinand I died, and the country was left in the care of a regency headed by Prince Nicholas of Romania, during the reign of Ferdinand's young grandson, Michael I (who was only six years old at the time), his father (Carol II) having renounced his rights to the throne in 1925. Carol II, unlike Carol I, in the beginning had no desire to rule Romania, and was frequently out of the country exploring the rest of Europe with his mistress. Michael's first reign would be short lived at only three years, until his father Carol II came back to contest the title at the behest of a dissatisfied political faction that staged a sudden 'coup d'état' (in spite of the fact that only a few years earlier he had renounced in official documents, written and signed in front of his own father, all his future claims to the throne of Romania).

After a ten-year rule, Carol II was forced to give up his crown in the wake of an outcry over the Second Vienna Award, which forced Romania to surrender northern Transylvania to Hungary. After the war, he married his longtime mistress, Elena Lupescu. The couple ultimately settled in Portugal, and the "playboy king" never returned to Romania.

The kingdom of Romania was a constitutional monarchy for most of its existence with the exception of 1938–1944, during the dictatorships of Carol II (1938–1940) and Ion Antonescu (1940–1944). On 23 August 1944, Michael I restored the last democratic royal Constitution of 1923. However, during his second reign (1940–1947), Michael I reigned mostly as an extraconstitutional king, without a parliamentary vote. Parliament was initially suspended and reinstated only later, in 1946. Michael I was crowned and anointed by the Orthodox Patriarch, Nicodim Munteanu, in the Patriarchal Cathedral of Bucharest, on the day of his second accession, 6 September 1940. However, legally, Michael I could not exercise much authority besides some prerogatives such as being the Supreme Head of the Army and designating a plenipotentiary prime minister Conducător ("Leader").

On 23 August 1944, with the Soviet Army already deep inside Romania's territory, Michael I deposed the German-allied dictator Ion Antonescu at the urging of the opposition parties and aligned the country with the Allies. Helped by the presence of Soviet forces, communists gradually took control of the administration. On 30 December 1947, King Michael I was forced to sign his abdication. The same day, Parliament proclaimed the country a people's republic. The young former king and former queen mother Elena were forced to leave Romania on January 3, 1948, in the royal train, at the request of the communist-dominated government. Royal properties were nationalized later that year.

Return from exile

After the Revolution of 1989, the former king visited Romania to an enthusiastic reception in the streets of Bucharest; the royal estates and  properties in Romania were restored. However, the country preserved its republican character.

The former king was respected and recognized by the Parliament. His grandson regularly visits different organizations in Romania. Princess Margareta and her husband bestow royal orders in name of the former king for selected Romanians.

The royal house is still popular and in 2014 Prime Minister Victor Ponta promised a referendum on whether or not to reinstate the monarchy if he were re-elected. A square was named in honor of King "Mihai" in 2012. Following the death of the former king in 2017, and the largely positive reaction of the crowds to the royal family at his funeral, Romanian politicians have discussed whether to hold a referendum to restore the monarchy, with around half the population (in early 2018) believing monarchy to be a better organisational form than a republic.

Kings of Romania (1881–1947)

Queens consort of Romania

Timeline
This is a graphical lifespan timeline of Kings, Heirs and Claimants to the Romanian throne.  The kings, the heirs and the claimants are listed in chronological order.

<div style="overflow:auto">

Royal Standards

See also
 Domnitor
 List of Romanian consorts
 List of rulers of Moldavia
 List of rulers of Wallachia
 List of heads of state of Romania
 Steel Crown of Romania
 Romanian Crown Jewels

References

Lists of Romanian monarchs
 
House of Hohenzollern-Sigmaringen

et:Rumeenia riigipeade loend
he:מלך הרומנים
hu:Románia uralkodóinak listája